France competed at the 2022 Winter Olympics in Beijing, China, from 4 to 20 February 2022.

On January 26, 2022, freestyle skier Kevin Rolland and alpine skier Tessa Worley were announced as the French flagbearers during the opening ceremony. Biathlete Quentin Fillon Maillet was the flagbearer during the closing ceremony.

Medalists 

The following French competitors won medals at the games. In the discipline sections below, the medalists' names are bolded.

| width="78%" align="left" valign="top" |

| width="22%" align="left" valign="top" |

Competitors
The following is a list of the number of competitors participating at the Games per sport/discipline.

Alpine skiing

By meeting the basic qualification standards, France has qualified at least one male and one female alpine skier.

CNOSF announced the 5 men and 7 women participating on 19 January 2022. 
One more woman and four more men were announced on 23 January 2022. 
One more man was announced on 24 January 2022 following a reallocation of quota by the FIS, Maxence Muzaton joins the French delegation in alpine skiing.

Men

Women

Mixed

Biathlon

Based on their Nations Cup rankings in the 2020–21 Biathlon World Cup and 2021–22 Biathlon World Cup, France has qualified a team of 6 men and 6 women.

CNOSF announced the 6 men and 6 women participating on 19 January 2022.

Men

Women

Mixed

Bobsleigh 

Based on their rankings in the 2021–22 Bobsleigh World Cup, France qualified 4 sleds. CNOSF announced the competing athletes on 19 January 2022.

Men

Women

* – Denotes the driver of each sled
Italic – Denotes a substitute athlete

Cross-country skiing

By meeting the basic qualification standards, France has qualified at least one male and one female cross-country skier.

CNOSF announced the 8 men and 5 women participating on 19 January 2022.

Distance
Men

Women

Sprint

Figure skating

In the 2021 World Figure Skating Championships in Stockholm, Sweden, France secured one quota in both the men's and ice dance competitions. Second quota for men's was secured at the 2021 CS Nebelhorn Trophy.

Individual

Mixed

Freestyle skiing

CNOSF announced the 8 men and 5 women competing on 19 January 2022.

Freeski
Men

Women

Moguls
Men

Women

Ski cross
Men

Women

Nordic combined

CNOSF announced the 5 athletes participating on 19 January 2022.

Short track speed skating

France has qualified two male and two female short track speed skaters as well as the mixed relay.

CNOSF announced the 4 athletes participating on 19 January 2022.

Men

Women

Mixed

Ski jumping

CNOSF announced 2 women participating on 19 January 2022.

Women

Snowboarding

CNOSF announced the 4 men and 5 women participating on 19 January 2022.

Freestyle

Snowboard cross

See also
France at the 2022 Winter Paralympics

References

Nations at the 2022 Winter Olympics
2022
Winter Olympics